This is a list of all the books in the Horrible Histories  book series.

Original Books 

∗Originally titled Even More Terrible Tudors

The original versions of the books each had a "The" interjected at the start of their titles. This was removed after 2007.

Two Horrible Books in One 

∗Originally titled Horribly Huge Book of Awful Egyptians and Ruthless Romans

Blood Curdling Box Set 

It includes the books: Savage Stone Age, Awesome Egyptians, Groovy Greeks, Rotten Romans, Cut-Throat Celts, Smashing Saxons, Vicious Vikings, Stormin' Normans, Angry Aztecs, Incredible Incas, Measly Middle Ages, Terrible Tudors, Slimy Stuarts, Gorgeous Georgians, Vile Victorians, Villainous Victorians, Barmy British Empire, Frightful First World War, Woeful Second World War and Blitzed Brits.

Specials 

∗Previously Bloody Scotland

∗∗Previously The USA

Handbooks

Horrible Histories Gruesome Guides 

Previously Horrible Histories Cities
Some Horrible Histories have been based around a particular city, rather than a nation or a specific time period. They also have a map when the front cover is folded out, and explain some structures in the city when the back cover is folded out. Therefore, many people consider them to be a sub-series as well. (Even though Loathsome London doesn't have these qualities, it was included into this sub-series during the republishing of the series from 2008 to 2011.

∗Previously Loathsome London

High Speed History 

High Speed History is a Horrible Histories sub-series beginning in 2010 that features historical tales in a comic-strip format.

Annuals

Novelty Books & Others

References

Horrible Histories
Horrible Histories